Bolshemedvedevsky is a rural locality (a khutor) in Mikhaylovka Urban Okrug, Volgograd Oblast, Russia. The population was 114 as of 2010. There are 9 streets.

Geography 
Bolshemedvedevsky is located 43 km northwest of Mikhaylovka. Rekonstruktsiya is the nearest rural locality.

References 

Rural localities in Mikhaylovka urban okrug